The Sri Lanka men's national under-18 basketball team is a national basketball team of Sri Lanka, administered by the Sri Lanka Basketball Federation.

It represents the country in international under-18 and under-19 (under age 18 and under age 19) basketball competitions.

See also
Sri Lanka men's national basketball team
Sri Lanka women's national under-18 basketball team

References

External links
Sri Lanka Basketball Records at FIBA Archive

U-19
Men's national under-18 basketball teams